The sooty mustached bat (Pteronotus quadridens) is a species of bat in the family Mormoopidae. It is found in Cuba, the Dominican Republic, Haiti, Jamaica, and Puerto Rico.

Description 
Sooty mustached bat is the smallest species in the genus Pteronotus. Color phases in this bat are indicators of age differences or bleaching due to high concentrations of ammonia in the roost. As a result, color ranges from grayish brown to yellowish brown with some individuals reaching an orange-brown phase. The body is completely covered in fur except for the wings and tail membrane. The margin above nostril is lobulated and slightly convex.

Mating and reproduction 
Sooty mustached bats are monoesturous and uniparous most of the time with twinning rarely occurring. Based on the testicular size, mating begins in January and most females are pregnant in May. The pregnant female undergoes an increase in body mass of 38%. Throughout the breeding season, either males or females might disappear completely into caves. However, there is a marked shift in adult sex ratio favoring females. This suggests sexual segregation during the maternity period.

Ecology

Pteronotus quadridens roost exclusively in caves. They are one of the most common bats in Cuba and Puerto Rico. All currently known fossils of Pteronotus quadridens are believed to be from late Pleistocene or Holocene epochs. The ancestors of Pteronotus quadridens are also expected to have originated on the Central American mainland.

Pteronotus quadridens is an insectivorous bat feeding almost exclusively on flying insects. They start foraging approximately 10 minutes before sunset and continue to do so overnight. Almost all foraging is done in flight.

There are two respective patterns of echolocation calls in the field. First they call with quasi-constant frequency at 81–84 kHz, followed by a downward, frequency-modulated (FM) call. When the bats are flying in confined spaces, the call duration will be shorter and the bandwidth higher than the ones emitted during the search calls in the field.

Pteronotus quadridens are susceptible to predation by diurnal birds since they are the first to leave just after the sunsets. Species such as American kestrel, red-tailed hawk and merlins are among a few of Pteronotus quadridens’ predators.

References

Pteronotus
Bats of the Caribbean
Mammals of Cuba
Mammals of the Dominican Republic
Mammals of Haiti
Mammals of Jamaica
Mammals of Puerto Rico
Mammals described in 1840
Taxa named by Juan Gundlach
Taxonomy articles created by Polbot